Come, Holy Spirit is a Christian prayer for guidance. It is discussed in the Catechism of the Catholic Church, paragraphs 26702672. It is used with the Catholic Church, as well as some Anglican and Lutheran denominations.

Come, Holy Spirit 
Typical English version:
Come, Holy Spirit, fill the hearts of Thy faithful and kindle in them the fire of Thy love.
Send forth Thy Spirit and they shall be created.
And Thou shalt renew the face of the earth.
Let us pray.
O God, Who did instruct the hearts of Thy faithful by the light of the Holy Spirit,
grant us in the same Spirit to be truly wise, and ever to rejoice in His consolation,
through Christ, our Lord. Amen.

Or in Latin:

Lutheran use 
The prayer is used as a canticle in the Nordic Lutheran Church of Sweden. Though rarely sung in regular worship, it is a standard part of the opening of clerical synods and during ordinations of priests, usually during the final rite, the vesting, after the newly ordained priests have completed their vows. In such cases, it is usually sung first in the Latin original, followed by the Swedish translation.

See also 
Veni Creator Spiritus
Praying to the holy spirit

References 

Come, Holy Spirit